Lee Kyu-seong (born 10 May 1994) is a South Korean football player who currently plays as a midfielder for Ulsan Hyundai in the K League 1.

Career 
Lee made his professional debut for Busan IPark on 27 June 2015 against Jeju United. He marked his debut with an early goal, although Busan went on to lose the game 3-1. Lee went on to become a regular in the side for the remainder of the season as Busan were relegated to the K League 2. Lee joined K League 1 side Sangju Sangmu on 28 May 2018 to complete his military service, and returned to his parent club in January 2020. In 2021, Lee joined Ulsan Hyundai, but he was immediately loaned to Seongnam FC. After one season with Seongnam, Lee returned to Ulsan and was a regular in central midfield as Ulsan won the 2022 K League 1 title. Lee was shortlisted for the K League Best XI for his performances in Ulsan's title-winning season.

Career statistics

Honours

Club
Ulsan Hyundai
 K League 1: 2022

References

External links 

1994 births
Living people
South Korean footballers
Association football midfielders
K League 1 players
Busan IPark players